Lieutenant Gerald Pilditch  (27 October 1892-November 1956) was a South African World War I flying ace credited with five aerial victories. He won a Military Cross on 11 April 1918. On 11 June, he rescued American pilot Lieutenant J. H. Ackermann from six German fighters. Pilditch shot down one, and possibly two, of the three Germans who were on the wounded American's tail.

Sources of information

References
Above the Trenches Supplement: A Complete Record of the Fighter Aces and Units of the British Empire Air Forces. Christopher F. Shores, Norman L. R. Franks, Russell Guest. Grub Street, 1996. , 

South African World War I flying aces
White South African people
Recipients of the Military Cross
1892 births
Alumni of Pretoria Boys High School
1956 deaths